Drawer is a component of furniture. 

Drawer or Drawers may also refer to:

 Someone who engages in drawing
 Payor, a person who draws a bill of exchange
 Cash drawer
 Open drawers, long underwear for the lower body
 Drawer test, a test used to detect rupture of the cruciate ligaments in the knee
 Drawer, a graphical user interface widget in the form of side sheets or surfaces containing supplementary content that may be anchored to, pulled out from, or pushed away beyond the left or right edge of the screen
 Drawer, the file system directories in the Workbench component of the Amiga computer operating system

See also 
 Draw (disambiguation)